Aappilattoq Heliport  is a heliport in Aappilattoq, a village in the Kujalleq municipality in southern Greenland. The heliport is considered a helistop, and is served by Air Greenland as part of a government contract.

There is also a heliport with the same name located in the village of Aappilattoq in Avannaata municipality in northwestern Greenland.

Airlines and destinations 

Air Greenland operates government contract flights to villages in the Nanortalik area. These mostly cargo flights are not featured in a timetable, although they can be pre-booked. Departure times for these flights as specified during booking are by definition approximate, with the settlement service optimized on the fly depending on local demand for a given day.

References

Heliports in Greenland